Statehood Day or Coronation Day is an annual public holiday in Lithuania celebrated on July 6 to commemorate the coronation in 1253 of Mindaugas as the only King of Lithuania. The exact day of the event is disputable and was chosen according to the hypothesis of Edvardas Gudavičius, formulated in 1989. The day has officially been celebrated since 1991.

Traditions
At 9 PM every year, Lithuanians all over the world are encouraged to sing the national anthem in the name of unity. The tradition has been around since 2009, when the anthem was sung to commemorate the millennium of the name of Lithuania.

See also
 Statehood Day in other countries

References 

Festivals in Lithuania
July observances
National days
Annual events in Lithuania
Summer events in Lithuania